The 2017 version of the Porsche 911 RSR is a racing car developed by Porsche to compete in the LM GTE categories of the Automobile Club de l'Ouest sanctioned FIA World Endurance Championship, European Le Mans Series and GTLM class, of the International Motor Sports Association's IMSA WeatherTech SportsCar Championship. It serves as the replacement for the Porsche 911 RSR (991). The car was unveiled in November 2016 at the Los Angeles Auto Show.

The 911 RSR clinched its first victory at the Northeast Grand Prix in July 2017 on Lime Rock Park.

The 911 RSR was developed into a licensed LEGO Technic scale model, released for purchase by the public in 2019.

Development 
In May 2016, the first images of the new car were shown in a press release, with the photographs issued only focusing on the front half of the car, igniting speculation that the car would be the first mid-engined 911 race car. Further reports by the German Auto magazine Auto motor und sport appeared to confirm the speculation, after it was revealed that Porsche had received a technical waiver from the FIA to move the engine forwards, and that Porsche had wanted to base its new GTE Class contender on the Porsche 918 Spyder, but it had been found to be too costly. In October 2016, the unmarked car was spotted testing at the Sebring International Raceway, in Florida. Spy photographs of the car showed a massive diffuser, compared with the current car being campaigned, and a series of air extractors located on the "window panel", suggesting it was mid-engined. 

The car was then launched at the 2016 LA Auto Show. At the launch of the car, it was revealed that Porsche did not actually seek, and the car never required any waiver, as the car had been fully legal and within the 2017 GTE rules.

Competition History

2017 IMSA WeatherTech Sportscar Championship

GT Le Mans Teams Championship

GT Le Mans Manufacturers' Trophy

2017 FIA World Endurance Championship

GT World Endurance Manufacturers' Championship

Endurance Trophy for LMGTE Pro Teams

2018 IMSA WeatherTech Sportscar Championship

GT Le Mans Teams Championship

GT Le Mans Manufacturers Championship

2018-19 FIA World Endurance Championship

World Endurance GTE Manufacturers' Championship

Endurance Trophy for LMGTE Pro Teams

Endurance Trophy for LMGTE Am Teams

2019 IMSA WeatherTech Sportscar Championship

GT Le Mans Teams Championship

GT Le Mans Manufacturers Championship

2019-20 FIA World Endurance Championship

Endurance Trophy for LMGTE Am Teams

References

911 RSR
Grand tourer racing cars
24 Hours of Le Mans race cars
LM GTE cars